Your Face Tomorrow Volume 2: Dance and Dream is a 2004 novel by the Spanish writer Javier Marías. Margaret Jull Costa's English translation was published by New Directions in 2006. It became a London Times Literary Supplement Best Book of 2007.

2004 novels
Novels by Javier Marías
21st-century Spanish novels
Alfaguara books